The 2004 Rally Australia (formally the 17th Telstra Rally Australia) was  the sixteenth and final round of the 2004 World Rally Championship. The race was held over four days between 11 November and 14 November 2004, and was based in Perth, Australia. Citroën's Sébastien Loeb won the race, his 10th win in the World Rally Championship.

Background

Entry list

Itinerary
All dates and times are AWST (UTC+8).

Results

Overall

World Rally Cars

Classification

Special stages

Championship standings
Bold text indicates 2004 World Champions.

Production World Rally Championship

Classification

Special stages

Championship standings
Bold text indicates 2004 World Champions.

Notes

References

External links 
 Official website of the World Rally Championship
 2004 Australia Rally at Rallye-info

Australia
Rally Australia
Rally